Hellinsia milleri is a moth of the family Pterophoridae. It is found in Ecuador.

The wingspan is 21 mm. The forewings are bone-white and the markings are dark brown. The hindwings and fringes are dark brown-grey. Adults are on wing in March, at an altitude of 3,180 meters.

Etymology
The species is named after. Dr. Jacqueline Y. Miller, associate director of the McGuire Center for Lepidoptera and Biodiversity, Florida Museum of Natural History, Gainesville Florida for giving the author the opportunity to study Ecuadorian material originally housed at the Allyn Museum of Entomology.

References

Moths described in 2011
milleri
Moths of South America